The 2003 Colorado Buffaloes football team represented the University of Colorado at Boulder during the 2003 NCAA Division I-A football season. The team played their home games at Folsom Field in Boulder, Colorado. They participated in the Big 12 Conference in the North Division. They were coached by head coach Gary Barnett. Colorado missed a bowl berth for just the fourth time since 1984.

Schedule

Game summaries

Colorado State

    
    
    
    
    
    
    
    
    
    
    

Joel Klatt 21/34, 402 Yds (first start at QB)

References

Colorado
Colorado Buffaloes football seasons
Colorado Buffaloes football